Pheasant Creek is a perennial to intermittent  north-by-northeast flowing stream in Santa Clara County, California, United States. It is tributary to Guadalupe Creek, which is in turn, tributary to the Guadalupe River and south San Francisco Bay at San Jose, California.

History
Pheasant Creek and the rest of the upper Guadalupe River watershed below the Guadalupe Reservoir and Dam were near the Guadalupe Mine, part of the New Almaden Mercury Mining District, established in 1845 in the hills south of San Jose, California, which hosted the first and most productive mercury mines in the state.

Watershed 
Pheasant Creek begins on the north slope of a ridge between Collords Peak and El Sombroso Mountain in the southern Santa Cruz Mountains. It is the second tributary to Guadalupe Creek below the dam, the first being Hicks Creek.

Ecology
According to numerous reports, Pheasant Creek's lower reaches host spawning steelhead trout (Oncorhynchus mykiss). A 2014–2015 steelhed trout survey found "Guadalupe Creek above Hicks Road had the longest contiguous area of flowing freshwater" with appropriate conditions for residence of O. mykiss in the Guadalupe River watershed, with the highest catch rate near the mouth of Pheasant Creek.

The entire Pheasant Creek watershed is protected on Sierra Azul Open Space Preserve lands.

See also 
 Guadalupe Creek
 Guadalupe River
 Sierra Azul Open Space Preserve

References

External links 
 Guadalupe-Coyote Resource Conservation District
 Sierra Azul Open Space Preserve, Midpeninsula Regional Open Space District

See also
 List of watercourses in the San Francisco Bay Area

Rivers of Santa Clara County, California
Santa Cruz Mountains
Rivers of Northern California